The Executive Master in EU Studies is organised by the Centre International de Formation Européenne (CIFE) in collaboration with the Jean Monnet-Chair of European Politics of the University of Cologne and other partners.

CIFE is a private non-profit-making international organisation which was established in 1954 and also is one of the six institutions which benefit from the Jean Monnet Programme "Support for specified institutions pursuing an aim of European interest" of the European Commission.

Aims and concepts
CIFE's Executive Master in EU Studies is a multi-disciplinary two-year (60 ECTS) curriculum, which offers flexible study paths and methods for professionals, postgraduates and officials who are pursuing their careers at the same time.

The participants of the programme receive structured knowledge of EU fundamentals and a focus on selected priority issues for an in-depth understanding and future-oriented approach to EU integration.

Methodology
In total, 8 intensive weekend workshops in Berlin, Budapest, Brussels, Nice, Rome and Vienna.

Curriculum 
The first year offers a range of compulsory and optional courses in EU history, political science, economics, EU law, lobbying, sustainable development and more. The second year combines high level teaching in the chosen specialisation with either a research track, leading to a Master's thesis or a professional track, intensifying skills and competences for the labour market.

Throughout the programme, the Executive Master in EU Studies teaches research and methodology based on best practices of the academic community. Additionally, the Executive Master in EU Studies offer skills and competences training such as a Council negotiation and ECJ simulation, cross-country comparative statistics, policy briefs, economic analyses and legal memos, opinions and writs as well as project management, public speaking, presentation and debate. Successful participants receive the title of Chargé de mission en organisations européennes et internationales (Policy Officer in European and International organisations), officially recognised by the French slate as will as the Executive Master in EU Studies awarded by CIFE.

References

Distance education institutions based in Germany